Borrby is a village in Vormsi Parish, Lääne County, in western Estonia. 
Borrby has only four inhabitants today (31 December 2011).

Gallery

References

 

Villages in Lääne County

sv:Ormsö#Geografi